Peter John Mitchell Thomas, Baron Thomas of Gwydir,  (31 July 1920 – 4 February 2008) was a British Conservative politician. He was the first Welshman to become Chairman of the Conservative Party, serving from 1970 to 1972, and the first Conservative to serve as Secretary of State for Wales, holding that office from 1970 to 1974.

Early life and career
Thomas was born in Llanrwst, where his father was a solicitor. He was educated at the village school, and then Epworth College in Rhyl, before reading law at Jesus College, Oxford.  He joined the Royal Air Force (RAF) in 1939, on the outbreak of the Second World War.  He was shot down while serving as a bomber pilot in 1941, and spent four years in prisoner-of-war camps in Germany, moving from Stalag Luft VI to Stalag Luft III and then at Stalag XI-B. He continued his legal studies while imprisoned, and was also an amateur actor.

He became a barrister after the war, and was called to the Bar in 1947 at Middle Temple.  He practised on the Wales and Chester circuit, and took silk in 1965. He became deputy chairman of Cheshire quarter sessions in 1966, and then of Denbighshire quarter sessions in 1968, serving in both offices until 1970.  He was a Crown Court recorder from 1974 to 1988, and also sat as an arbitrator on the Court of Arbitration of the International Chamber of Commerce in Paris.

He was bilingual in Welsh and English, and took an active part in the Gorsedd, attending Eisteddfodau under the bardic name Pedr Conwy (Welsh: Peter from Conway).

Marriage

He married Tessa Dean in 1947.  She was the daughter of actor and film and theatrical producer Basil Dean and his wife, Lady Mercy Greville. His wife died in 1985, and he outlived both of their two sons. He was survived by his two daughters upon his death in February 2008 at the age of 87.

Political career
Thomas was elected to Parliament as MP for Conway in 1951, winning a narrow majority in the marginal seat over the Labour incumbent.  He turned down the position of Under-Secretary of State for Wales at the Home Office to concentrate on his legal career, but later served as Parliamentary private secretary to Sir Harry Hylton-Foster (the Solicitor General and later Speaker) from 1954 to 1959.  He was a member of the Council of Europe from 1957 to 1959, and sponsored the private members bill that became the Eisteddfod Act 1959.

He served as Parliamentary Secretary at the Ministry of Labour 1959–61, taking charge of the measures that abolished the requirements for employees to be paid in cash and the maximum wage for professional footballer (£14 per week in November 1960).  He moved to become Under-Secretary of State at the Foreign Office in 1961, travelling to Moscow with Lord Home in 1963 to sign the Nuclear Test Ban Treaty.  He was promoted to Minister of State for Foreign Affairs in 1963, and was sworn of the Privy Council in the Queen's Birthday Honours of 1964, but left office when his party lost the 1964 general election. In opposition, he was a spokesman on foreign affairs and then law from 1965 to 1966.  Although he had held his Conway seat (and steadily increased his majority) since 1951, he narrowly lost to Labour at the 1966 general election, but returned as MP for Hendon South at the general election in June 1970, a position which he held until retiring in 1987.

During the whole of Edward Heath's premiership he held the position of Secretary of State for Wales.  He was Secretary of State during a period of violent activism by proponents of the Welsh language, including bombings and a campaign by the Cymdeithas yr Iaith Gymraeg (Welsh Language Society) to remove English road signs.  In February 1971, paralleling plans to reorganise local government in England, Thomas announced the plans to replace the existing 181 local councils with 7 new county councils counties and 36 district councils.  An extra county council was added later, for Cardiff.  Thomas also served as Chairman of the Conservative Party between 1970 and 1972.

Thomas remained Welsh spokesman after the Conservative Party lost the general election in February 1974, but left the front bench when Margaret Thatcher became party leader in February 1975.  He became active on backbench committees, and was president of the Conservative Friends of Israel.  He retired from the House of Commons at the 1987 general election, and was raised to the peerage for life in the Dissolution Honours that year, gazetted as Baron Thomas of Gwydir, of Llanrwst in the County of Gwynedd.

Arms

References

Obituary, The Times, 7 February 2008 
Obituary, The Daily Telegraph, 7 February 2008
Obituary, The Guardian, 6 February 2008
Obituary, The Independent, 7 February 2008

External links 

1920 births
2008 deaths
Conservative Party (UK) MPs for Welsh constituencies
Thomas of Gwydir
Secretaries of State for Wales
Members of the Privy Council of the United Kingdom
Welsh King's Counsel
Conservative Party (UK) MPs for English constituencies
UK MPs 1951–1955
UK MPs 1955–1959
UK MPs 1959–1964
UK MPs 1964–1966
UK MPs 1970–1974
UK MPs 1974
UK MPs 1974–1979
UK MPs 1979–1983
UK MPs 1983–1987
Royal Air Force officers
Royal Air Force pilots of World War II
World War II prisoners of war held by Germany
Alumni of Jesus College, Oxford
British World War II prisoners of war
Chairmen of the Conservative Party (UK)
Ministers in the Macmillan and Douglas-Home governments, 1957–1964
Stalag Luft III prisoners of World War II
British World War II bomber pilots
Shot-down aviators
Life peers created by Elizabeth II